Sensory Overload is a first-person shooter video game developed and published by Reality Bytes for the Macintosh.

Gameplay
Sensory Overload is a game in which the player is a CIA agent who pretends to be a test subject to investigate a facility for medical research.

Reception
Next Generation reviewed the game, rating it three stars out of five, and called it "definitely worth checking out."

Reviews
Computer Gaming World

References

1994 video games
Classic Mac OS games
Classic Mac OS-only games
First-person shooters
Sprite-based first-person shooters
Spy video games
Video games developed in the United States